Rng or RNG may refer to:

Science, mathematics and technology
 Random number generator, a computational or physical device
 Relative neighborhood graph, an undirected graph used in computational geometry
 RELAX NG, an XML schema language whose files use the extension .rng
 Renewable natural gas 
 Rng (algebra), an algebraic structure similar to rings but without a multiplicative identity

Transport
 Ranggung LRT station (LRT station abbreviation), Sengkang, Singapore
 Raniganj railway station, West Bengal, India

Other
 Ramnath Goenka Excellence in Journalism Awards (RNG Awards)
 RingCentral, American company (NYSE stock symbol RNG)
 R'n'G, a Dutch hip hop duo
 Ronga language, a southeastern Bantu language
 Royal Never Give Up, Chinese esports team
 University of Reading Herbarium
 R&G (Rhythm & Gangsta): The Masterpiece 2004 studio album by rapper Snoop Dogg